Praslinia cooperi, or Cooper's black caecilian, is a species of caecilian in the family Grandisoniidae. It is monotypic in the genus Praslinia. It is found on Mahé  and Silhouette Islands in the Seychelles. An old reported sighting on its namesake Praslin is not known to be correct.

References

 

Indotyphlidae
Monotypic amphibian genera
Amphibians described in 1909